John Papsidera is a casting director based in Los Angeles, California, known for his work across film and television, especially his work with some of the most successful directors such as Christopher Nolan, Ruben Fleischer, Jason Reitman, Roland Emmerich, and James Gunn. He has sixteen nominations Artios Awards and won four times. He has also been nominated for seven Primetime Emmy awards and won twice.

His casting credits in film include The Dark Knight, Inception, Interstellar, Memento, Enchanted, Final Destination, Zombieland, Venom, Jurassic World and The Suicide Squad. On television, his credits include shows such as Westworld, The Expanse (seasons 1 and 2), Peacemaker, Wednesday, Yellowstone and It's Always Sunny in Philadelphia (season 1).

Film Credits

Casting director
 Uncharted (2022)
 Ghostbusters: Afterlife (2021)
 The Suicide Squad (2021)
 Army of the Dead (2021)
 Tenet (2020)
 Project Power (2020)
 Bloodshot (2020)
 Zombieland: Double Tap (2019)
 Venom (2018)
 Dunkirk (2017)
 Jurassic World (2015)
 Interstellar (2014)
 The Dark Knight Rises (2012)
 The Grey (2012)
 The Details (2011)
 Inception (2010)
 Burlesque (2010)
 The Crazies (2010)
 Unthinkable (2010)
 Zombieland (2009)
 Drag Me to Hell (2009)
 Dragonball Evolution (2009)
 The Informers (2009)
 The Dark Knight (2008)
 Enchanted (2007)
 Black Christmas (2006)
 Final Destination 3 (2006)
 The Prestige (2006)
 Batman Begins (2005)
 The Longest Yard (2005)
 Catwoman (2004)
 Club Dread (2004)
 Secret Window (2004)
 Agent Cody Banks 2: Destination London (2004)
 My Boss's Daughter (2003)
 Octane (2003)
 Dickie Roberts: Former Child Star (2003)
 Willard (2003)
 Final Destination 2 (2003)
 Memento (2000)
 Final Destination (2000)
 Another Day in Paradise (1998)
 Austin Powers: International Man of Mystery (1997)

Awards and nominations

Artios Awards 
Nominated, 2009, Outstanding Achievement in Casting - Big Budget Feature - Drama for: The Dark Knight
Nominated, 2008, Outstanding Achievement in Casting – Studio Feature - Comedy for: ‘‘ Enchanted (shared with Marcia Ross and Susan Shopmaker)
Won, 2006, Best Dramatic Pilot Casting for: Prison Break (Wendy O’Brien and Claire Simon)
Won, 2005, Best Movie of the Week for: Lackawanna Blues (shared with Wendy O’Brien)
Nominated, 2005, Best Mini Series Casting for: Revelations (shared with Wendy O’Brien and John Buchan)
Won, 2004, Best Casting for TV, Dramatic Pilot for: Carnivàle (shared with Wendy O’Brien)
Nominated, 2004, Best Casting for television film of the Week for: And Starring Pancho Villa as HimselfNominated, 2003, Best Casting for television film of the Week for: Live with BaghdadWon, 2001, Best Casting for Feature Film, Independent for: MementoNominated, 2000, Best Casting for television film of the Week for: If These Walls Could Talk 2Nominated, 1999, Best Casting for Feature Film, Independent for Another Day in ParadiseNominated, 1995, Best Casting for television film of the Week for Kingfish: A Story of Huey P. Long (shared with Mindy Marin)

 Primetime Emmy Awards 
Nominated, 2021, Outstanding Casting for a Comedy Series for: The Flight Attendant 
Nominated, 2018, Outstanding Casting for a Drama Series for: Westworld 
Nominated, 2017, Outstanding Casting for a Drama Series for: Westworld 
Won, 2005, Outstanding Casting for a Miniseries, Movie or a Special for Lackawanna BluesNominated, 2004, Outstanding Casting for a Drama Series for: Carnivàle (Shared with Wendy O’Brien)
Won, 2003, Outstanding Casting for a Miniseries, Movie or a Special for: Live with BaghdadNominated, 2000, Outstanding Casting for a Miniseries, Movie or a Special for: If These Walls Could Talk 2''

References

External links 
 

American casting directors
Living people
Year of birth missing (living people)